Joseph Haydn wrote his Symphony No. 36 in E major, Hoboken 1/36, some time in the first half of the 1760s, around the same time as his Symphony No. 33, for Prince Nikolaus Esterházy. Scored for 2 oboes, bassoon, 2 horns, strings and continuo, the slow movement features solos for violin and cello. It is in four movements:

Vivace, 
Adagio in B major, 
Menuet – Trio (Trio in B major), 
Allegro,

References

Symphony 036
1760s compositions
Compositions in E-flat major